The India cricket team toured England in the 1936 season and played 28 first-class fixtures, winning only four whilst losing 12 and drawing 12. They played three Test matches against England and lost the series 2–0 with one match drawn. England won the First Test by 9 wickets at Lord's; the Second Test at Old Trafford was drawn; England won the Third Test at The Oval by 9 wickets.

The India team was captained by the Maharajkumar of Vizianagram, who was neither the greatest player nor the greatest captain of all time. But the team did include several top-class players such as Vijay Merchant, Mushtaq Ali and C. K. Nayudu.

Touring party

 Maharajkumar of Vizianagram (c)
 C. K. Nayudu
 Syed Wazir Ali
 Mohammad Nissar
 Vijay Merchant
 Lala Amarnath
 Phiroze Palia
 Baqa Jilani
 Khershed Meherhomji (wk)
 Dattaram Hindlekar
 L. P. Jai
 M. J. Gopalan
 Cotah Ramaswami
 Mushtaq Ali
 Amir Elahi
 Shute Banerjee
 Mohammad Hussain
 Amar Singh
 Jahangir Khan
 Dilawar Hussain

The India squad for the tour was suggested by the Selection Committee consisting of the Nawab of Bhopal Hamidullah Khan, the Nawab of Pataudi and Maharajkumar of Vizianagram to the Board of Cricket Control on 16 February 1936. The Maharajkumar was named the captain. The Yuvraj of Patiala Yadavindra Singh declined to be a part owing to personal reasons. Syed Mohammad Hadi was named the treasurer of the squad for the tour.

Test Series

First Test

Second Test

Third Test

Controversy
Another top-class player was Lala Amarnath but the tour was marred by controversy as recorded in A Right Royal Indian Mess on CricInfo, with Amarnath being sent home early for spurious "disciplinary" reasons.  Ultimately, after a long saga of closed ranks and establishment incompetence, he was completely exonerated.

References

Annual reviews
 Wisden Cricketers' Almanack 1937

Further reading

External links
 Tour home at ESPNcricinfo
 Tour Directory at ESPNcricinfo archive
 Tour of England 1936 at test-cricket-tours.co.uk
 

1936 in English cricket
1936 in Indian cricket
English cricket seasons in the 20th century
1936
International cricket competitions from 1918–19 to 1945